A gas evolution reaction is a chemical reaction in which one of the end products is a gas such as oxygen or carbon dioxide. Gas evolution reactions may be carried out in a fume chamber when the gases produced are poisonous when inhaled or explosive.

Examples
 A replacement reaction concerning zinc metal and dilute sulfuric acid.
 Zn + H_2SO_4 (dil) -> ZnSO_4 + H_2 ^
 In this example, diatomic hydrogen gas is released. Dilute hydrochloric acid can be used in place of dilute sulfuric acid.

 A replacement reaction where gaseous hydrogen chloride and fluorine gas react to release diatomic chlorine gas (because fluorine is more electronegative):
 2HCl + F_2 -> 2HF + Cl_2 ^

See also
 Gasogene
 Kipps apparatus
 Gas generator
 Thermal decomposition
 Oxygen evolution

References

Chemical reactions
Industrial gases